Microvelia karunaratnei is a species of smaller water strider in the family Veliidae. It has only been recorded in Sri Lanka and is one of the few veliid species known to inhabit tree holes.

References

Veliidae
Insects described in 1999
Insects of Sri Lanka